Christopher O'Dowd (born 9 October 1979) is an Irish actor and comedian. He received wide attention as Roy Trenneman, one of the lead characters in the Channel 4 comedy The IT Crowd, which ran for four series between 2006 and 2010. He has also starred in several films, Gulliver's Travels (2010), Bridesmaids, Friends with Kids (both 2011), Cuban Fury (2014), Miss Peregrine's Home for Peculiar Children (2016) and The Cloverfield Paradox (2018). He created and starred in the Sky 1 television series Moone Boy, which aired between 2012 and 2015 and brought him Irish Film and Television Award nominations in acting, writing, and directing.

Since 2017, he has appeared as Miles Daly in the Epix comedy series Get Shorty. He had a recurring role on the comedy-drama series Girls. His performance in the British comedy TV series State of the Union won him a Primetime Emmy Award. He made his Broadway debut in the play adaptation of Of Mice and Men in 2014, for which he was nominated for a Tony Award. In 2020, he was listed at number 39 on The Irish Times list of Ireland's greatest film actors. In November 2022, he appeared as the character Philip in the Netflix film Slumberland.

Early life
O'Dowd was born and raised in Boyle, in County Roscommon on 9 October 1979. His father, Seán, is a sign designer, and his mother, Denise, a counsellor and psychotherapist. He is the youngest of five siblings.

He represented Roscommon in Gaelic football at under-16, minor and under-21 levels, the highlight being his performance as a goalkeeper in the 1997 Connacht Minor Football Championship final against Mayo, a game which RTÉ Sport covered and aired as part of its The Sunday Game highlights programme.

He studied politics and sociology at University College Dublin (UCD), and subsequently attended the London Academy of Music and Dramatic Art. He told the UCD student newspaper the College Tribune: "I didn't finish my degree. The politics part of it was fine, but I was doing sociology as well and I could never bring myself to find an interest in it." He contributed to The University Observer and was active in UCD Dramsoc and the Literary and Historical Society.

Career

O'Dowd starred in the United Kingdom in Channel 4's comedy The IT Crowd, BBC Two's Roman's Empire, Red Cap, and the award-winning documentary-drama The Year London Blew Up. He has also appeared on Irish television, having starred in the RTÉ One drama The Clinic and the drama Showbands alongside Kerry Katona.

He has appeared in How to Lose Friends & Alienate People in a minor role. He has also had roles in a number of films, including the 2005 film Festival where he played stand-up comedian Tommy O'Dwyer, a role for which he won a Scottish BAFTA award, and a small role in Vera Drake. He appears in Frequently Asked Questions About Time Travel, a comedy sci-fiction film with Marc Wootton, Dean Lennox Kelly, and Anna Faris. He played Liam in the 2007 German film .

He starred in the 2009 film The Boat That Rocked, inspired by the story of offshore pirate broadcasters Radio Caroline, which was released in Canada and the U.S. as Pirate Radio. O'Dowd plays Simon, the station's breakfast DJ. "The breakfast jock on Radio Caroline at the time was Tony Blackburn, so there's definitely an element of him in it," O'Dowd says of his character. "And then I called in different Irish DJs that would have been contemporaries of Tony Blackburn at the time, a guy called Larry Gogan and a couple of other people."

O'Dowd starred opposite Sienna Miller in the film Hippie Hippie Shake, about the groundbreaking '60s magazine Oz, the precursor to a whole generation of lad mags. O'Dowd plays Felix Dennis, who later became the publisher of Maxim, and his landmark indecency trial. In preparation for the role, O'Dowd met with Dennis, and said, "He was an incredibly charismatic man."

In April 2009, it was announced that O'Dowd was cast in a remake of Gulliver's Travels as General Edward Edwardian. "It's shooting in Pinewood from the end of April", he said, shortly after his participation was announced. "I'm just going back to England to learn how to ride a horse... I'm a general in the army, so there's going to be a little bit of horse riding. I think it's going to be really fun though, we're all kind of learning together."

O'Dowd appeared in the 2010 film Dinner for Schmucks, an American version of the French farce Le Dîner de Cons. He also appeared on panel show Never Mind the Buzzcocks (season 21, episode 11), and starred in an ITV2 comedy series entitled FM. In 2010, he took part in Little Crackers, writing and directing a short film loosely based on his own childhood and Christmas in his family home from 1984–88. In April 2011, he starred in the BBC adaptation of The Crimson Petal and the White as William Rackham, and in the May 2011 release Bridesmaids as Officer Nathan Rhodes.

O'Dowd had a supporting role in This Is 40. He described "fighting over Megan Fox in a pool" during filming as "one of the most fun things I've ever done".

He played Dave in Wayne Blair's 2012 debut feature Australian musical The Sapphires. Based on a popular stage show, it was shot across Australia and Vietnam and produced by Goalpost Australia. He is to write and executive produce a new American comedy series called Big Men, after NBC won the bidding war for it.

He co-wrote Moone Boy, a series based on his childhood, for Sky 1. It was filmed in his hometown of Boyle. Segments of it ran from 2012 to 2015. O'Dowd has also co-written some books based on the series: Moone Boy: The Blunder Years (published May 2015), Moone Boy: The Fish Detective (October 2015), Moone Boy: The Notion Potion (September 2017), and an activity book, Moone Boy: The Marvellous Activity Manual (May 2017).
 
From April to July 2014, O'Dowd starred in the Broadway revival of Of Mice and Men, directed by Anna D. Shapiro and co-starring James Franco and Leighton Meester, for which O'Dowd was nominated for a Drama Desk and Tony Award for Best Actor in a Play. He starred as a Catholic school teacher in the 2014 film St. Vincent with Bill Murray and Melissa McCarthy. He was also the narrator for the 2014 RTÉ documentary Man on Bridge.

From 2017 to 2019, O'Dowd played the lead role in three seasons of the MGM+ television show Get Shorty, created by Davey Holmes and co-starring Ray Romano, for which O'Dowd received a nomination for Best Actor in a Leading Role from the 2018 IFTA Film & Drama Awards.

In 2022 Chris played Philip in the Netflix film Slumberland alongside Jason Momoa, Kyle Chandler and young actress Marlow Barkley.

Personal life
O'Dowd married British writer, director, and television presenter Dawn Porter in 2012. After their marriage, Dawn changed her surname to O'Porter.

O'Dowd says he has developed an antitheist philosophy, and believes religion is "going to be like racism" in terms of social unacceptability and condemnation.

In April 2014, he presented at the Broadway Cares/Equity Fights AIDS Easter Bonnet Competition with Leighton Meester and James Franco, after raising donations for their Broadway show Of Mice and Men.

On 1 February 2015, it was announced on Twitter that O'Porter gave birth to their son, Art O'Porter, a week earlier. On 1 July 2017, O'Porter gave birth to their second son, Valentine. The family divide their time between homes in Los Angeles, California; Bermondsey, London; and Margate, Kent.

Filmography

Film

Television

Stage

Books
Moone Boy: The Blunder Years, Chris O'Dowd and Nick V. Murphy (2015)
Moone Boy: The Fish Detective, Chris O'Dowd and Nick V. Murphy (2016)
Moone Boy: The Notion Potion, Chris O'Dowd and Nick V. Murphy (2017)

References

External links

 
 
 

1979 births
20th-century Irish male actors
21st-century Irish male actors
Living people
Alumni of the London Academy of Music and Dramatic Art
Alumni of University College Dublin
Audiobook narrators
Best Actor AACTA Award winners
Critics of religions
Former Roman Catholics
Gaelic football goalkeepers
Irish atheists
Irish former Christians
Irish male comedians
Irish male film actors
Irish male stage actors
Irish male screenwriters
Irish male television actors
Irish male video game actors
Irish male voice actors
Irish screenwriters
Irish television producers
People from Boyle, County Roscommon
People from Sligo (town)
Primetime Emmy Award winners
Roscommon Gaelic footballers
Theatre World Award winners